Patent Pending is the only album by Heavens, a side project formed by Matt Skiba, vocalist and guitarist for Alkaline Trio, and Josiah Steinbrick of F-Minus.

The duo are accompanied on the album by a number of accomplished musicians, including The Mars Volta's Isaiah "Ikey" Owens.

Track listing
All songs by Heavens (Steinbrick/Skiba) except where noted
 "Gardens" – 3:05
 "Counting" – 3:39
 "Heather" – 3:53
 "Patent Pending" – 3:45
 "Dead End Girl" (Steinbrick/Skiba/Ben Lovett) – 4:58
 "Doves" – 0:56
 "Another Night" – 3:36
 "Annabelle" (Steinbrick/Skiba/Sam Soto) – 3:53
 "Watching You" – 4:14
 "True Hate" – 5:16
 "Leave" – 4:45

Production
Produced by Ben Lovett and Heavens
Engineered by Ben Lovett at Sunny Heights
Mixed by Ryan Hewitt
Assisted by George Gumbs
Mixed at Paramount Recording, Los Angeles and Encore Studios, Burbank
Mastered by Tom Baker at Precision Mastering
String engineering by Dana Neilsen and Donnie Whitbeck
String arrangement by Amanda Course, Todd Simon and Ben Lovett
Art direction and design by Nick Pritchard
Photography by Bryan Sheffield

Additional musicians
Matthew Compton: drums, percussion, piano
Adam Zuckert: additional drums
Isaiah "Ikey" Owens: organ
Erica Daking: backing vocals
Ben Lovett: drum programming, rhodes, synth, wurlitzer, percussion, noise, backing vocals, additional vocals and guitar on "Dead End Girl"
Julie Carpenter: violin
Marina Hall: violin
Paloma Udovic: violin
Amanda Course: viola
Mia Barcia-Colombo: cello
Ana Lenchantin: cello

Samples
Listen to "Patent Pending" at Epitaph.com

2006 debut albums
Epitaph Records albums
Heavens (band) albums
Albums produced by Ben Lovett